This is a list of notable unpublished works for which an original manuscript or copy is known to exist but for various reasons unpublished, unrecorded, or inaccessible to the public.  Usually the manuscript is in the possession of a private owner who is unwilling to share it for viewing, copying, or recording.

Frédéric Chopin
 Valse in B

Charles Gounod
 George Dandin

Franz Liszt
 Klavierstück in E flat S.152a
 Grand Solo caractèristique d'apropos une chansonette de Panseron S.153b (discovered 1987)

See also
 Unfinished_creative_work#Classical_music

References

Unpublished musical compositions